Keep On Keepin' On is the twelfth studio album by the country rock band the New Riders of the Purple Sage.  It was released in 1989 by Mu Records, and subsequently re-released by Relix Records.

Keep On Keepin' On is the first of two studio albums by the New Riders to feature only one original member of the band, John Dawson, the second being 1992's Midnight Moonlight.  It includes a version of the Grateful Dead song "Friend of the Devil", which was co-written by Dawson.

The album is more influenced by folk-rock and bluegrass music than the band's previous efforts, partly due to the contributions of multi-instrumentalist Rusty Gauthier.

Track listing

"Keep On Keepin' On" (John Dawson) – 3:33
"Now I Call It Love" (Dawson) – 2:46
"It's O.K. to Cry" (Val Fuentes, Rusty Gauthier, Lina Valentino) – 3:18
"Bounty Hunter" (Fuentes, Gauthier, Valentino) – 4:01
"Barbaric Splendor" (Joe New) – 3:19
"Señorita" (Dawson) – 3:00
"Night of the Living Lonely" (Johnson, New) – 2:58
"Rancher's Daughter" (Dawson) – 3:02
"Big Ed" (Gauthier) – 3:17
"Friend of the Devil" (Dawson, Jerry Garcia, Robert Hunter) – 3:36

Personnel

New Riders of the Purple Sage
John Dawson – acoustic guitar, jaw harp, lead and background vocals
Rusty Gauthier – acoustic guitar, lap steel guitar, dobro, fiddle, banjo, twelve-string guitar, lead and background vocals
Gary Vogensen – electric guitar, background vocals
Greg Lagardo – drums
Michael White – bass

Additional musicians
Jennifer Hall – background vocals
Jeanette Sartain – background vocals
Carolyn Gauthier – background vocals
Boots Hughston
Kincaid Miller
Lina Valentino
Val Fuentes
Bill Amatneek
Stu Feldman
Bing Nathan
Bob Black

Production
Boots Hughston – producer, executive producer, mixing
Bob Heyman – executive producer
Ricky Lynd – engineer, mixing
Wendy Bardsley – second engineer
Jamie Bridges – sub-engineer
Tom Flye – mixing
Bob Missbach – mixing
Mixed at Hyde Street Studios, San Francisco

Notes

New Riders of the Purple Sage albums
1989 albums